Roque Fernandes dos Ramos (born 13 January 1998) is a São Tomé and Príncipe sprint canoeist. He competed in the 2020 Summer Olympics.

References

1998 births
Living people
São Tomé and Príncipe male canoeists
Olympic canoeists of São Tomé and Príncipe
Canoeists at the 2020 Summer Olympics
African Games gold medalists for São Tomé and Príncipe
Competitors at the 2019 African Games
African Games medalists in canoeing